Chala Sar (also Romanized as Chalā Sar and Chalāsar) is a village in Goli Jan Rural District, in the Central District of Tonekabon County, Mazandaran Province, Iran. At the 2006 census, its population was 571, in 176 families.

References 

Populated places in Tonekabon County